Paula Ormaechea was the defending champion, but chose not to participate.

Mariana Duque won the title, defeating María Fernanda Álvarez Terán 7–6(8–6), 4–6, 6–3 in the final.

Seeds 

  Julia Cohen (quarterfinals)
  María Fernanda Álvarez Terán (final)
  Vivian Segnini (second round)
  Andrea Koch-Benvenuto (quarterfinals)
  Mariana Duque (champion)
  Andrea Gámiz (semifinals)
  Karen Castiblanco (quarterfinals)
  Adriana Pérez (quarterfinals)

Main draw

Finals

Top half

Bottom half

References 
 Main draw
 Qualifying draw

Open Seguros Bolivar - Singles
2011 WS